Hayati Yazıcı (born 23 May 1952 in Çayeli, Rize Province) is a Turkish lawyer and politician. He served as Turkey's Minister of Customs and Trade.

Biography
Hayati Yazıcı graduated in 1975 from the School of Law at Istanbul University. Starting of 1976, he served as a judge in the Istanbul Court of justice. In 1984, he quit his post to begin a career as freelance lawyer registered with Istanbul Bar.

A co-founder of the Justice and Development Party, he is Recep Tayyip Erdoğan's lawyer and vice-chairman of the Party. Hayati Yazıcı entered the parliament in 2002 as deputy of Istanbul Province, and was later appointed Deputy Prime Minister, responsible for the coordination between the government and the parliament.

Hayati Yazıcı is married and father of two children.

References

External links
 Turkish Grand National Assembly official website 

1952 births
People from Çayeli
Istanbul University Faculty of Law alumni
Turkish judges
20th-century Turkish lawyers
Government ministers of Turkey
Deputy Prime Ministers of Turkey
Living people
Deputies of Rize
Justice and Development Party (Turkey) politicians
Deputies of Istanbul
Ministers of Customs and Trade of Turkey
Members of the 24th Parliament of Turkey
Members of the 23rd Parliament of Turkey
Members of the 22nd Parliament of Turkey
Members of the 26th Parliament of Turkey
Ministers of State of Turkey
Members of the 60th government of Turkey